VW Leo Minoris is a tight quadruple star system, located in the constellation of Leo Minor. With a peak combined apparent visual magnitude of 8.07, it is too faint to be seen with the naked eye. Parallax measurements give a distance estimate of approximately 370 light years from the Sun, and it is drifting further away with a radial velocity of +5 km/s.

Hierarchy of orbits

This system was found to be variable using observations with the Hipparcos satellite. It is classified as an A-type W Ursae Majoris eclipsing binary, where the two stars share a common envelope. The eclipse of the primary causes the magnitude of the system to drop to 8.45. They have a combined stellar classification of F2V, matching an F-type main sequence star.

In 2006 an additional, detached binary component was discovered, making this a quadruple star system. The components (3 & 4) have a combined stellar class of G2V, showing a match with a G-type main-sequence star.

The two binaries (1–2 & 3–4) orbit each other with a period of 355 days and an eccentricity of 0.1. The plane of their orbit is close to coplanar (within 5°) with the orbital plane of the detached binary. This outer orbit appears stable, suggesting there is no additional outlying component to this system. The nearby ninth magnitude star HD 95606 (HIP 53969) shares a common proper motion with this system and may be loosely gravitationally bound. They likely all formed in the same protostellar cloud.

References 

F-type main-sequence stars
G-type main-sequence stars
W Ursae Majoris variables
4
Leo Minor
BD+31 2225
095660
054003
Leonis Minoris, VW